Samuel Irton (29 September 1796 – 10 July 1866) was a British Conservative politician.

The only son of Edmund Lamplugh Irton and Harriet née Hayne, daughter of Richard Hayne, Irton was born at Irton Hall. He was first educated at Shrewsbury School, admitted during Michaelmas in 1814. He then was admitted to St John's College, Cambridge in February 1814. In 1825, he married Eleanor, daughter of Joseph Tiffin Senhouse, but they had no children. Upon his death in 1866, his estates were passed to his cousin Elizabeth Fell.

Irton was first elected Conservative MP for West Cumberland at a by-election in 1833—caused by William Lowther opting to sit for Westmorland—and held the seat until 1847 when he stood down. He returned for the seat at the 1852 and served for one further term until 1857, when he again stood down.

Outside of his political career, Irton was both a Justice of the Peace and a Deputy Lieutenant for Cumberland.

References

External links
 

Conservative Party (UK) MPs for English constituencies
UK MPs 1832–1835
UK MPs 1835–1837
UK MPs 1837–1841
UK MPs 1841–1847
UK MPs 1852–1857
1796 births
1866 deaths